Sarab-e Dowkal (also Romanized as Sarāb-e Dowkāl, Sarāb Do Kal, Sarāb Dukāl, and Sarāb-e Do Kal; also known as Sarab Dogol) is a village in Sis Rural District, Bolbanabad District, Dehgolan County, Kurdistan Province, Iran. At the 2006 census, its population was 136, in 32 families. The village is populated by Kurds.

References 

Towns and villages in Dehgolan County
Kurdish settlements in Kurdistan Province